James Burt (28 October 1792 – 4 September 1858) was an English amateur cricketer who played first-class cricket from 1825 to 1832.  He was mainly associated with Hampshire and Marylebone Cricket Club (MCC), of which he was a member.  He made 13 known appearances in first-class matches, including 3 for The Bs from 1828 to 1832.

References

1792 births
1858 deaths
English cricketers
English cricketers of 1787 to 1825
English cricketers of 1826 to 1863
Hampshire cricketers
Marylebone Cricket Club cricketers
Non-international England cricketers
The Bs cricketers